= Archaean =

Archaean may refer to:

- Archaean or Archean, a geologic eon between Hadean and Proterozoic
- Something related to Archaea, a domain of traditionally prokaryotic microorganisms
